Deceit (Italian: Il gioco) is a 1999 Italian mystery film. The working title was Commedia.

Cast
 Jonathan Pryce 	as Mark
 Susan Lynch 	as Corinna
 Claudia Gerini 	as Michela
 Enrico Silvestrin 	as Tino
 Alessandra Acciai 	as Fiammetta 
 Brian Protheroe    
 Fionnula Flanagan

External links

1999 films
Films shot in Italy
Italian mystery films
1990s Italian-language films
1990s mystery films
Films scored by Luis Bacalov
1990s English-language films
1990s Italian films